This article lists the members of the 39th Parliament of Canada and their voting records in regards to the Civil Marriage Act. Bill C-38 amended the Marriage Act of Canada to recognize same-sex marriage. The 39th Parliament was elected at the federal election of January 23, 2006. The Conservative leader, Stephen Harper, who was then leader of the opposition campaigned on holding another free vote on the issue, after one was held in the 38th Parliament to approve the Act. Although Harper expressed a hope to reinstate the opposite-sex only definition of marriage, he promised not to use the notwithstanding clause. A number of legal experts contend the clause would need to be invoked if parliament was to ban or restrict same-sex marriage in light of provincial court decisions on the matter, which have all handed down the same decision: barring same-sex marriage is inconsistent with the guarantees contained in the Canadian Charter of Rights and Freedoms, a part of the Constitution of Canada.

The Conservatives won enough seats to form a government following the election but Harper, who became Prime Minister, only had enough seats to form a minority government meaning the opposition parties had enough seats to defeat a government motion on same-sex marriage. However, a motion could pass if it could attract enough support from individual opposition MPs in a free vote. The government announced that it would introduce a motion before the end of 2006.

On 7 December 2006, the House of Commons of Canada voted on a motion that read as follows: "That this House call on the government to introduce legislation to restore the traditional definition of marriage without affecting civil unions and while respecting existing same-sex marriages."  The motion was defeated by a vote of 123 to 175.  Liberal and Conservative parties gave their members permission to vote freely. Thirteen Conservatives voted against the motion, and the same number of Liberals voted in favour. The Bloc Québécois and NDP caucuses were expected to oppose the motion, all NDP MPs did so as did all BQ MPs except for two who were paired and two who were absent.

Following the vote, Harper announced that the issue was now settled and that his government would not revisit the matter even if it won a majority government in the next election, held October 14, 2008.

Votes

House of Commons Vote, December 7, 2006

A majority of votes 154 were needed to ensure the motion passed, although the only formal requirement for passing one is the assent of a majority of members in attendance for the vote.

Note: For and Against mean "for restoring traditional marriage" and "against restoring traditional marriage".
Note: The Speaker of the House of Commons, Peter Milliken, a Liberal, could only vote in the unlikely event of a tie.

Background

Same-sex marriage became legal in Canada in 2003 when a series of court decisions declared that denying the privilege to homosexuals was unconstitutional. The Civil Marriage Act was approved by the Canadian House of Commons on June 28, 2005, by a margin of 158 to 133 and was subsequently passed by the Senate of Canada on July 19, 2005, before being given Royal Assent on July 20, 2005. This law brought the two provinces where such court challenges had not been resolved, Alberta and Prince Edward Island, in line with the rest of the country. The issue remained controversial and Conservative leader Stephen Harper pledged to revisit the issue with a free vote should the Conservatives form a government. Harper's party won the greatest number of seats in the 2006 federal election. Harper said that he would address this issue by means of a simple motion to the House as to whether or not the matter should be revisited. If the motion were to pass his government would introduce legislation to change the legal definition of marriage to two opposite sex couples, while creating civil unions for same-sex couples; should the motion be defeated, the government will take no further action.

House of Commons

Conservative Cabinet

Conservative backbench

Liberal Party

Bloc Québécois
Leader Gilles Duceppe announced on February 10, 2006, that he would force the caucus to vote against Harper's motion.

New Democratic Party
The NDP caucus did not allow a free vote so MPs were obliged to vote against the Conservative motion.

Independents

Speaker
The Speaker of the House of Commons votes only in the event of a tie. Milliken is a Liberal.

References

Same-sex marriage in Canada
Canadian federal legislation